Dhupguri Railway Station is one of the major railway station between New Jalpaiguri & New Cooch Behar which serves the city of Dhupguri in Jalpaiguri district of West Bengal. The station lies on the New Jalpaiguri–New Bongaigaon section of Barauni–Guwahati line of Northeast Frontier Railway. The station lies on Alipurduar railway division.

Trains
No of halting trains: 52

Major trains
 Silchar-Coimbatore Superfast Express
Silchar-Thiruvananthapuram Aronai Superfast Express
Lokmanya Tilak Terminus - Dibrugarh Express
Kamakhya–Shri Mata Vaishno Devi Katra Express
Dibrugarh-Lalgarh Avadh Assam Express
Lokmanya Tilak Terminus–Guwahati Express
Guwahati - Sir M. Visvesvaraya Terminal, Kaziranga Superfast Express
Tambaram-Silghat Town Nagaon Express
Guwahati-Jammu Tawi Amarnath Express
Jammu-Guwahati Lohit Express
Dibrugarh–Tambaram Express
Sealdah–Agartala Kanchenjunga Express
Sealdah–Silchar Kanchenjunga Express
Dibrugarh-Howrah Kamrup Express via Guwahati
Dibrugarh–Howrah Kamrup Express Via Rangapara North
Sealdah-New Alipurdiar Teesta Torsha Express
Delhi-Dibrugarh Brahmaputra Mail
Sealdah-Bamanhat Uttar Banga Express
New Jalpaiguri - Bongaigaon Express
New Tinsukia - Darbhanga Jivachh Link Express

References

Railway stations in Jalpaiguri district
Alipurduar railway division